Philip Walter Foden (born 28 May 2000) is an English professional footballer who plays as a midfielder for  club Manchester City and the England national team. He is considered one of the best young players in the world.

Foden's breakthrough into professional football came in 2017 when he won the FIFA U-17 World Cup Golden Ball award following England's successful Under-17 World Cup campaign. He made his debut for City during the same year and in December was named BBC Young Sports Personality of the Year.

Foden has since made over 100 appearances for the club, winning nine honours including becoming the youngest recipient of a Premier League winners' medal. In 2019, he won a second Premier League and became the club's youngest-ever goalscorer in the UEFA Champions League, and is the youngest English player to both start a match and score in the knockout stages of the competition. In 2021, he was named as the Premier League Young Player of the Season and the PFA Young Player of the Year.

Foden has represented England at many youth levels, scoring 19 goals in 51 youth caps. He was first called up to the senior team on 25 August 2020 and made his debut against Iceland on 5 September 2020, in a 1–0 UEFA Nations League victory.

Club career

Manchester City

Early career

Born on 28 May 2000 in Stockport, Greater Manchester, Foden was a boyhood supporter of Manchester City. He joined the club at the age of four and signed his Academy scholarship in July 2016. He was privately educated at St Bede's College, with his tuition fees being paid for by Manchester City. On 6 December 2016, City head coach Pep Guardiola included Foden in the matchday squad for the Champions League group stage match with Celtic; he was an unused substitute in the 1–1 home draw.

2017–18 season

In July 2017, Foden was included in Manchester City's squad for the club's pre-season tour of the United States, where he performed impressively in a 0–2 loss to Manchester United and also started in a 4–1 win over Real Madrid.

After making several appearances on the bench at the start of the 2017–18 season, Foden made his Manchester City debut on 21 November 2017 in a Champions League game against Feyenoord, coming on in the 75th minute for Yaya Touré. He became the fourth-youngest English player to make an appearance in the Champions League (17 years 177 days). On 6 December 2017, Foden broke the record previously held by Josh McEachran to become the youngest English player, at the age of 17 years and 192 days, to start a UEFA Champions League match, doing so in a 2–1 defeat to Shakhtar Donetsk. On 20 October 2020, Jude Bellingham, aged 17 years and 113 days, broke Phil Foden's record to become the youngest Englishman to start a Champions League match. Foden also became the first player born in the year 2000 to start a match in the competition. He made his Premier League debut as a substitute in a 4–1 win over Tottenham Hotspur on 16 December 2017, appearing in the 83rd minute for İlkay Gündoğan.

Foden featured as a late substitute for Sergio Agüero in the EFL Cup Final on 25 February 2018, helping City secure a 3–0 victory against Arsenal at Wembley Stadium. The following month, he broke Kieran Richardson's record to become the youngest English player to start in a knockout-match in the Champions League, doing so at the age of 17 years and 283 days in a 4–0 win over Basel. On 13 May, he became the youngest ever player to receive a Premier League winners' medal. Guinness World Records recognised him for this feat in the 2020 edition of their book.

2018–19 season
Foden was part of City's starting line-up for the FA Community Shield on 5 August 2018, playing a total of 75 minutes as well as assisting Agüero's first goal of the game in a 2–0 victory over Chelsea at Wembley Stadium, marking Foden's third winners' medal of the calendar year. On 25 September 2018, he provided an assist to Riyad Mahrez and later scored his first senior goal in injury time to secure City a 3–0 away win against Oxford United in the third round of the EFL Cup.

Foden scored his first home goal at the Etihad Stadium, netting the second for City during their 7–0 victory against Rotherham United in the third round of the FA Cup on 6 January 2019. Three days later, Foden was again on the scoresheet as he helped City defeat Burton Albion 9–0 in the first leg of the EFL Cup semi-finals. On 12 March 2019, Foden scored his first Champions League goal during the second leg of the last-16 tie against Schalke, as City won 7–0 (10–2 on aggregate). In doing so, he helped the club equal the record for the largest winning margin in the knockout phase of the competition. His goal also saw him become Man City's youngest-ever goalscorer in the Champions League and the youngest English goalscorer to score in the knock-out stages of the competition, aged 18 years and 288 days. At the start of the following month, he made his first league start for the club in a 2–0 win over Cardiff City, becoming the youngest English player to do so since Daniel Sturridge in 2008. After the match, City manager Pep Guardiola told media that he expected Foden to be an important Manchester City player "for the next decade".

Foden scored his first Premier League goal on 20 April 2019, in a 1–0 victory over Tottenham Hotspur. Upon doing so, he became the third-youngest player to score for the club in the Premier League, after Micah Richards and Sturridge. Man City ended the season completing a domestic sweep of all trophies with Foden having an increasingly prominent role in the squad.

2019–20 season
Foden began the 2019-20 season with his 7th honour, winning the FA Community Shield against Liverpool at Wembley Stadium on 4 August 2019. He scored in the penalty shoot-out which decided the victors. Six days later, he made his first Premier League appearance of the season as Manchester City beat West Ham United 5–0 at the London Stadium.

On 1 October 2019, Foden scored his first goal of the season in the UEFA Champions League, netting in a 2–0 home victory against Dinamo Zagreb on match-day 2 of the group stage. Foden created the second most big chances (6) in the UEFA Champions League group stage, only behind Lionel Messi (7).

Foden made his first Premier League start of the season, on 15 December 2019, picking up an assist for Kevin De Bruyne against Arsenal at the Emirates Stadium in a 3–0 victory for the Citizens.

On 1 March 2020, Foden started in the EFL Cup Final and claimed his 6th major honour and his 8th career trophy as Man City won 2–1 against Aston Villa. He was also named man of the match, thereby becoming the youngest recipient of the Alan Hardaker Trophy. 

On 17 June 2020, Premier League football returned after the COVID-19 pandemic had put the season on hold. Foden was on the scoresheet as City put three past Arsenal at the Etihad stadium. The following match, Foden scored his first Premier League brace and scored in consecutive league games for the first time as Manchester City won 5–0 against Burnley at home. On 2 July 2020, Manchester City welcomed newly crowned champions Liverpool to the Etihad. Foden scored and assisted Raheem Sterling’s goal as City won 4–0.

The 2019–20 Premier League season ended on 26 July, with Foden starting in a 5–0 victory over Norwich City, seeing Manchester City finish the season in 2nd place. The occasion, however, was marked with the departure of Foden’s idol David Silva, after 10 years with the club. In 2017, Foden stated "Training is faster and it has been great playing with Silva, he's my idol really. I try and watch what he does and learn from him and try and do the same things." Foden was tipped to take over from Silva with Pep Guardiola saying that Manchester City "trust" Phil Foden to replace him.

Foden started his second UEFA Champions League knockout tie on 7 August 2020, against Real Madrid, helping his side win 2–1 (4–2 on aggregate) and progress on to the quarter final, where Man City would bow out of the competition. He ended the season with 38 games played, registering 8 goals and 9 assists across all competitions.

2020–21 season
Foden opened his account for the 2020-21 season against Wolverhampton Wanderers on match-day 1 of the Premier League season, netting in a 3–1 away victory on 21 September 2020. He scored his second league goal of the season, against West Ham in a 1–1 draw at the London Stadium, on 24 October 2020. He equalised just six minutes after replacing Sergio Agüero at half time, turning smartly to convert a cross from teammate João Cancelo. Foden scored his first UEFA Champions League goal of the season in Greece against Olympiacos, on 25 November 2020, a smart finish from inside the box after a delightful Raheem Sterling cut back. This win in the Champions League secured City’s progress through to the round of 16 stage for the 8th consecutive season.

On 7 February 2021, Foden scored a goal and provided an assist for İlkay Gündoğan’s goal in a 4–1 away win over Liverpool, to be his team's first win at Anfield since 2003. Foden once again scored in Merseyside, as Manchester City won 3–1 away at Everton on 17 February, stretching their lead at the top of the table and making it 17 consecutive wins in all competitions. Foden was on the scoresheet in both legs of City's Champions League quarter-final tie against Borussia Dortmund, securing their progress to the last four of the competition. 

On 21 April 2021, Foden received the man of the match award and scored against Aston Villa at Villa Park, to give Man City a 2–1 victory and subsequently extended their lead, at the top of the table, to 11 points. This was Foden’s 14th goal in all competitions, in the 2020–21 season and his 7th in the Premier League. Just four days later, Foden won his 9th trophy with Manchester City as they beat Tottenham Hotspur 1–0 in the EFL Cup Final, with Foden playing the full 90 minutes. Foden once again made history with City, as they reached the UEFA Champions League Final for the first time after beating Paris Saint-Germain 4–1 on aggregate, with Foden providing an assist to Riyad Mahrez in the second leg. On 12 May, Foden secured his third Premier League title in four years, as Manchester United were beaten 2–1 by Leicester City. Foden was named in the starting 11 in City’s first ever UEFA Champions League Final in the club's history. Man City would lose the match 1–0 against Chelsea – Foden’s first loss in a final during his senior career. He was named in the UEFA Champions League Squad of the season and won the Premier League Young Player of the Season while being nominated for both the PFA Player of the Year and PFA Young Player of the Year, winning the latter award.

2021–22 season 
Foden's injury before the Euro 2020 Final resulted in him missing the start of the Premier League campaign, not being involved against Tottenham, Norwich City and Arsenal, while being an unused substitute against Leicester City. He started, scored, provided two assists and won man of the match in a 6–1 victory in the EFL Cup, against Wycombe Wanderers. Foden scored his first Premier League goal of the season on 3 October, in a 2-2 away draw at Liverpool. He received man of the match in a group stage match in the Champions League, against Club Brugge KV – he would go on to score against Club Brugge in the second leg of the tie. Foden scored a brace in a 4-1 away victory against Brighton & Hove Albion while also providing the assist for Riyad Mahrez’s goal, in the Premier League, which earnt him man of the match. He also scored the winner and was awarded man of the match in a 1-0 away win at Brentford, but missed the next game against Arsenal due to fitness issues.

Foden scored twice in two games, in away wins against Norwich City and Sporting Lisbon – on the 12 and 15 February respectively. He once again scored a winning goal and was awarded man of the match at Everton in a 1-0 away win on 26 February. Foden also scored against Real Madrid, in the 4–3 home victory in the semi-finals of the Champions League, though Real Madrid would win the second leg 3–1 at the Bernabéu, knocking Manchester City out of the competition. He was also involved in City's incredible comeback against Aston Villa, on the final day, to win the Premier League title, over Liverpool.

Foden finished the year with 14 goals, including nine in the Premier League. He also won the PFA Young Player of the Year award, as well as the Premier League Young Player of the Season for the second consecutive year. Additionally, Foden was nominated for PFA Player of the Year and the 2021–22 Ballon D'Or award.

2022–23 season 
On 2 October 2022, Foden scored his first career hat-trick in a 6–3 home win against Manchester United. On 14 October 2022, Foden signed a three-year extension to his current contract which will keep him at Manchester City until 2027.

International career

Youth
In May 2017, Foden scored in the final of the 2017 UEFA European Under-17 Championship as the England under-17s suffered a penalty shoot-out defeat at the hands of Spain.

In October of the same year, Foden gained widespread press attention after scoring twice in the final of the 2017 FIFA U-17 World Cup, also against Spain, as England won the competition. He was named as the best player of the tournament.

He won the FIFA U-17 World Cup Golden Ball award in 2017 where he also gained some widespread press attention and significant media coverage.

On 27 May 2019, Foden was included in England's 23-man squad for the 2019 UEFA European Under-21 Championship and scored an impressive goal — his first for the U21s — in the opening 2–1 defeat to France in Cesena.

Senior

Debut and Euro 2020
On 25 August 2020, Gareth Southgate named Foden in the England senior squad for the first time. He made his international debut against Iceland on 5 September 2020, in a 1–0 away victory in the UEFA Nations League tournament. On 7 September, Foden, alongside England teammate Mason Greenwood, was withdrawn from the England squad due to breaking the team's COVID-19 isolation protocols by bringing at least one guest to their team hotel in Iceland. Manchester City condemned Foden's actions.

Foden scored his first and second goals for England during a UEFA Nations League match against Iceland at Wembley Stadium on 18 November 2020.

On 1 June 2021 Foden was named in the 26-man squad for the newly rescheduled UEFA Euro 2020. He joined up with the squad at a later date due to his participation in that year's UEFA Champions League Final. On 8 June, Foden revealed that he had dyed his hair blonde – drawing comparisons to former England midfielder Paul Gascoigne who also had a similar haircut for Euro 96. Foden said in a press conference on the same day that: "The full nation know what he means to the country and what he did, so it won’t be too bad if I try to bring a bit of Gazza on to the pitch."

2022 FIFA World Cup 

On 10 November 2022, Foden was included in the 26-man squad for England's 2022 FIFA World Cup campaign in Qatar. He made his first appearance in the competition as a 71st-minute sub in a 6–2 win against Iran. On 29 November, he scored England's second goal in the 51st minute in a 3-0 win against Wales. It was also his first goal in a major international tournament for his country. In the following game against Senegal, Foden assisted Harry Kane's goal in the third minute of extra time in the first half. He then followed this up in assisting Bukayo Saka in his second-half goal in the 57th minute.

Style of play
Foden is left-footed, and can play as a wing-back, or a winger on the right, though Pep Guardiola has described him as "more of a midfielder". In 2017, Guardiola described him as "a special player", saying: "It's dangerous to say good things about young players because they are still young, and they have to grow and they have to learn many, many things... But we have a lot of confidence to help him, because we believe he is a guy who has potential, even if he's not strong, he's not tall." In 2017, Louise Taylor of The Guardian described Foden as "boasting tight, adhesive control and blessed with the knack of drifting past opponents". In 2018, veteran football writer Brian Glanville described him as a "gifted and precocious teenager", adding: "Young players of his skill and inventive quality are pitifully thin on the ground." During his time with Manchester City, he was occasionally also used in a central attacking role as a false 9 by manager Pep Guardiola.

Personal life
Foden has two children with his long-term girlfriend; a son born in 2019 and a daughter born in 2021.

Career statistics

Club

International

England score listed first, score column indicates score after each Foden goal

Honours
Manchester City
Premier League: 2017–18, 2018–19, 2020–21, 2021–22
FA Cup: 2018–19
EFL Cup: 2017–18, 2018–19, 2019–20, 2020–21
FA Community Shield: 2018, 2019
UEFA Champions League runner-up: 2020–21

England U17
FIFA U-17 World Cup: 2017
UEFA European Under-17 Championship runner-up: 2017

England
UEFA European Championship runner-up: 2020

Individual
UEFA European Under-17 Championship Team of the Tournament: 2017
FIFA U-17 World Cup Golden Ball: 2017
BBC Young Sports Personality of the Year: 2017
Alan Hardaker Trophy: 2020
UEFA Champions League Squad of the Season: 2020–21
Premier League Young Player of the Season: 2020–21, 2021–22
PFA Young Player of the Year: 2020–21, 2021–22

References

External links

Profile at the Manchester City F.C. website
Profile at the Football Association website

2000 births
Living people
Footballers from Stockport
English footballers
Association football midfielders
Manchester City F.C. players
Premier League players
England youth international footballers
England under-21 international footballers
England international footballers
UEFA Euro 2020 players
2022 FIFA World Cup players
Footballers educated at St Bede's College, Manchester